Alexandr Mikhailovych Kondratov (October 3, 1937 in Smolensk – April 16, 1993 in St.Petersburg) was a Russian linguist, biologist, journalist and poet. He wrote many books on subjects as various as ancient and modern languages, history, mathematics, paleontology, geology, cryptozoology, Atlantis, and he also wrote poetry. He was the first Russian to write a monography about dinosaurs purportedly surviving into modern times.

Selected bibliography

Atlantis
 Атлантиды моря Тетис (Atlantides of the Tethys Sea), 1986
 Атлантиды пяти океанов (Atlantides of the Five Oceans, 1987
 Атлантиды ищите на шельфе (Seek the Atlantis on the Shelf), 1988 - a trilogy

Other submerged lands
 Атлантика без Атлантиды (The Atlantic Ocean without Atlantis, 1972)
 Адрес — Лемурия? (The Address - Lemuria?), 1978
 Была земля Берингия (There was Beringia), 1981
 Была земля Арктида (There was Arktida), 1983

Ancient civilizations
 Великаны острова Пасхи (Giants of The Easter Island), 1966
 Погибшие цивилизации (Vanished Civilizations), 1968
 Когда молчат письмена. Загадки древней Эгеиды (When letters are silent - Mysteries of ancient Egeis), 1970 with V. V. Shevoroskin (В.В.Шеворошкин)
 Этруски — загадка номер один (The Etruscan civilization - Mystery Number One, 1977)
 Великий потоп. Мифы и реальность (The Deluge. Myths and Reality), 1982

Paleontology
 Динозавра ищите в глубинах (Seek the Dinosaur in the Depths), 1984
 Шанс для динозавра (The Chance for the Dinosaur), 1992

Oceanology
 Тайны трех океанов (The Riddles of Three Oceans), 1971
 Загадки Великого океана (Mysteries of The Pacific Ocean), 1974
 Следы на шельфе (Tracks on the Shelf), 1981

Mathematics
 Математика и поэзия (Mathematics and Poetry), 1962
 Число и мысль (Number and Mind), 1963
 Электронный разум (The Electronic Reason), 1987

References

External links 
 Bibliography, in Russian
 To the memory of A. M. Kondratov, in Russian
 Photo plus short bio- and bibliography, in Czech

1937 births
1993 deaths
20th-century Russian poets
20th-century Russian male writers
Cryptozoologists
Russian male poets
Russian biologists